Svircë (Serbian Cyrillic: Свирце) is a village in Kamenica municipality, Kosovo. It is located in the Gollak mountains.

Part of the village of Svirce is located in Serbia.

Demographics 
As of 2011 this village has 59 inhabitants. All of them are Albanian.

References 

Villages in Kamenica, Kosovo